The Medina River is located in south central Texas, United States, in the Medina Valley.  It was also known as the Rio Mariano, Rio San Jose, or Rio de Bagres (Catfish river).  Its source is in springs in the Edwards Plateau in northwest Bandera County, Texas and merges with the San Antonio River in southern Bexar County, Texas, for a course of 120 miles. It contains the Medina Dam in NE Medina County, Texas which restrains Lake Medina. Much of its course is owned and operated by the Bexar-Medina-Atascosa Water District to provide irrigation services to farmers and ranchers.

History
The Medina River was named after Pedro de Medina, a Spanish cartographer, by Alonso de León, Spanish governor of Coahuila, New Spain in 1689.   It once served as the official boundary between Texas and Coahuila with the San Antonio River being considered its tributary.  At that time, the river was called the Medina all the way to the Gulf of Mexico, but now the part below the confluence is called the San Antonio River.

From 1849, Castroville on the river was a water stop on the San Antonio-El Paso Road and a stagecoach station on the San Antonio-El Paso Mail and San Antonio-San Diego Mail Line.

Natural features
Much of the source water to the Medina River is produced by springs emerging due to the presence of the Balcones Fault. This locale of the Balcones Fault is associated with an important ecological dividing line for species occurrence. For example, species such as the California Fan Palm, Washingtonia filifera, occur only west of the Medina River or Balcones Fault.

The Medina River once received significant waste discharge from upstream catfish farming operations, which utilized more water than was sustainable to the basin's safe usage.

See also
 List of rivers of Texas
 Medina Valley Independent School District
 Medina, Bandera County, Texas

Notes

References
 
 Robert Glennon. 2004. Water Follies: Groundwater Pumping and the Fate of America's Fresh Waters, Island Press, 314 pages  , 
 C. Michael Hogan. 2009. California Fan Palm: Washingtonia filifera, GlobalTwitcher.com, ed. Nicklas Stromberg

External links

 

Medina County, Texas
Rivers of Texas
Bodies of water of Medina County, Texas
Rivers of Bandera County, Texas
Rivers of Bexar County, Texas
San Antonio–El Paso Road